Robert Renan Alves Barbosa (born 11 October 2003) is a Brazilian footballer who plays as a centre back for Zenit St. Petersburg.

Club career 
Robert Renan made his first team debut on 20 April 2022 in 1–1 away draw against Portuguesa da Ilha in Copa do Brasil. He made his Série A debut on 26 June 2022 in a 0–0 home draw against Santos.

In January 2023, Robert Renan signed for Russian Premier League club Zenit Saint Petersburg on a five-year contract.

International career 
Robert Renan has played internationally for Brazil at under-18 and under-20 levels.

On 3 March 2023, Robert received a surprise call-up to the senior Brazil national team by the interim manager Ramon Menezes for a friendly against Morocco.

Career statistics

Club

Honours
Brazil U20
 South American U-20 Championship: 2023

References

External links 

2003 births
Living people
Brazilian footballers
Association football defenders
Sport Club Corinthians Paulista players
FC Zenit Saint Petersburg players
Campeonato Brasileiro Série A players
Russian Premier League players
Brazilian expatriate footballers
Expatriate footballers in Russia
Brazilian expatriate sportspeople in Russia